James Joseph Munday Sr. (7 July 1887 – 27 May 1955) was an Australian rules footballer who played with Geelong in the Victorian Football League (VFL).

Notes

External links 

1887 births
1955 deaths
Australian rules footballers from Victoria (Australia)
Geelong Football Club players